Galeandra minax is a species of orchid native to Brazil and Venezuela.

References

minax
Orchids of South America
Plants described in 1874
Flora of Brazil